Asproula (previously Velisti) is a village in the Kozani regional unit, Greece. It is situated at an altitude of 744 meters above sea level. The postal code is 50001, and the telephone code is +30 24680. The population was 122 at the 2011 census.

References

Populated places in Kozani (regional unit)